Vijender Kumar (born 10June 1968) is a professor of Law and currently serving as the Vice-Chancellor of Maharashtra National Law University, Nagpur, a National Law University in Nagpur, Maharashtra, India.  With his experience as a legal professional at Bar Council of India, and also as an Academic administrator in Indian legal realm, Kumar is regarded as one of the authorities on the subject of Family law in India.

Education
Vijender Kumar received his primary school education in Chhutmalpur, a small village in the Saharanpur District of the Indian state of Uttar Pradesh. After completing his graduation and post graduation in law in 1993, Kumar went on to receive a doctoral degree in law with specialization in 'Hindu Law of Adoption' and was supervised by Prof. Ranbir Singh in 1995.

Career
He has experience at the Bar prior to teaching. Kumar started his teaching career as assistant professor at the National Academy of Legal Studies and Research (NALSAR) University of Law, Hyderabad, India, where he taught family law, legal research methodology and Hindu law of adoption to undergraduate and postgraduate scholars. In the year 2009, Kumar received the prestigious Commonwealth Fellowship and visiting professorship at King's College London, England. In the February 2013, he was appointed as registrar of the Nalsar University of Law, where he served for more than a year. He was instrumental in successfully holding recruitments for permanent faculty in 2015 thereby satisfying one of the major requirements of the university. Now he is appointed as vice-chancellor of Maharashtra National Law University, Nagpur. He is a distinguished Professor at Rajiv Gandhi National University of Law (RGNUL), Patiala, Himachal Pradesh National Law University (HPNLU), Shimla and other National Law Universities. Further, he has been elected as the President by the Members of General Body of Consortium of National Law Universities on January 31st, 2023. Prof. Kumar was the Vice-President of the Consortium of NLUs from November 14, 2021 to January 31st, 2023 and the Convenor from November 12, 2020 to November 14, 2021.

Contributions
Prof. Kumar has published more than seventy research articles in reputed law journals on ‘Hindu Law’, ‘Research Methodology’ and “Legal Education’ in journals such as the Journal of the Indian Law Institute, Contemporary Law Review, Journal of Law and Public Policy and also contributed chapters in several books. Prof. Kumar has authored Three (03) Books including Being A Law Teacher; Law Relating To Domestic Violence And Hindu Law Of Adoption: Principles And Precedents and revised Three(03) books including John D. Mayne's Hindu Law & Usage (16th, 17th and 18th Edition), G.C.V. Subba Rao’s Family Law in India and G.C.V. Subba Rao’s Hindu Law. He has also Co-edited seventeen (17) books relating to Family Law, Jurisprudence, Cyber Law, Human Rights, Constitutional Law among more
He has worked on several projects including projects commissioned by the National Commission for Women, New Delhi on “Coparcenary Rights of Women in Andhra Pradesh”; “A Study of Law and Nanotechnology: Exploring the Dimensions for Tackling the Nanotechnology Revolution with Special Relevance to Human Rights and Environment” funded by the Shastri Indo-Canadian Institute, New Delhi; he also worked on a two-year Collaborative  Research  Project tilted “Non Resident Indians (NRI) Marriages: Need for a New Legal Regime” for which a grant was supported by the Department of Higher Education, Ministry of Human Resource Development, Government of India and Shastri Indo-Canadian Institute, New Delhi. Prof. Kumar has participated and presented papers in several National and International Conferences/ Seminar/ Webinars/ Conclaves. He had also participated in the Law Teachers Programme on “Law Teaching and Legal Research Skills” at Cardiff Law School, (UK) in 2004. Prof. Kumar has been and is a member of many committees of the UGC, NAAC, NIRF, NITI AAYOG, UPSC etc. and contributed in holistic growth of legal education and profession. Prof. Kumar advocates for Socratic and Cooperative Methods of teaching-learning pedagogy and ICT based techniques while helping faculty members in designing of the Course Curriculum of law and allied disciplines. For many years now, he has been a member of Board of Studies, Academic Planning and Monitoring Board, Academic Council, Executive Council, and General Council of many NLUs and other universities.

Books
 .
 “Law Relating to Domestic Violence 2007”
 “Family Law in India” of Professor G.C.V. Subba Rao, (8th edition 2004, 9th edition 2007 and 10th edition 2011); and 
 .
 .
 .
 “Law, Judiciary and Governance 2017”
 “Women, Law and Society 2019”
 “Being A Law Teacher 2019”
 .
 .
 his co-edited books titled “Alternative Dispute Resolution: Prospects and Challenges 2020”, 
 “Surrogacy: Law, Policy and Practice 2020”,

References

1968 births
Heads of universities and colleges in India
Indian lawyers
Living people
20th-century Indian educational theorists
Writers from Uttar Pradesh
20th-century Indian educators
Scholars from Uttar Pradesh